Vern Donald Freiburger (December 19, 1923 – February 27, 1990) was an American Major League Baseball first baseman who started two games for the Cleveland Indians near the end of the 1941 season (September 6 and September 15). At 17 years of age, he was the youngest player to appear in an American League game that season.

Freiburger's amateur baseball career began at the age of 12, when he played for the Class A amateur group of the Detroit Firemen's League; he played American Legion Baseball during this time as well. While playing sandlot ball for them, Freiburger was discovered by Indians scout Cy Slapnicka, and was signed to a contract with an invitation to spring training in 1941 at the age of 17. At the time, Freiburger was a student at Detroit Eastern High School with a year left until graduation, which he put on hold to pursue a professional baseball career. After spring training ended in 1941, he was sent to the Flint Arrows to gain some professional baseball experience. During his time with the Arrows, the team faced the Indians in an exhibition game which they won, 3-2. In the game, Freiburger had two runs batted in to give the team the win.

By the end of the minor league season, Arrows manager Buzz Wetzel considered Freiburger to be nearly major-league ready, and found him to be one of the best hitters in the minor leagues that season. Freiburger made his major league debut a couple weeks later on September 8 in a  doubleheader against the Detroit Tigers. His second and final appearance in a game was against the New York Yankees at Yankee Stadium. In his two games he was 1-for-8 (.125) with one run batted in, and in 84 minor league games he had a batting average of .318.

Freiburger re-signed with the Indians organization in 1942 and joined the major league team for spring training in part due to the folding of the Michigan State League. In late March, before spring training had concluded, Freiburger was sent to the Cedar Rapids Raiders of the Three-I League, where he spent the 1942 season. In 115 games, he had a batting average of .301 and 23 doubles. The following season, the Indians had intended to make Freiburger part of the major league roster due to Hal Trosky's retirement making a hole at the first base position. Instead, he was called to serve in World War II, and he spent the next three years with the United States Navy.

Upon returning from military service, Freiburger spent the 1946 season with the Charleston Rebels and the Wilkes-Barre Barons, where he played 69 total games. The following year, he played in 90 total games for the Concord Weavers and Rock Hill Chiefs. He spent the 1948 season and part of the 1949 season with the Suffolk Goobers of the Virginia League. His longest tenure with one team was the Emporia Nationals of the Virginia League, who he played for from 1949 to 1951. He ended his professional baseball career in 1951 with the Palatka Azaleas.

Freiburger died at the age of 66 in Palm Springs, California. He was buried in the Good Shepherd Cemetery in Huntington Beach, California.

References

External links

Retrosheet

1923 births
1990 deaths
Major League Baseball first basemen
Cleveland Indians players
Baseball players from Detroit
Sportspeople from Palm Springs, California
Concord Weavers players
United States Navy personnel of World War II
Suffolk Goobers players
Emporia Nationals players
Emporia Rebels players